The Southeastern League was the name of four separate baseball leagues in minor league baseball which operated in the Southeastern and South Central United States in numerous seasons between 1897 and 2003.  Two of these leagues were associated with organized baseball; the third and most recent incarnation was an independent league that operated for two seasons in 2002–03.

History

Class D league (1910–12)
After playing a season in 1897, the Southeastern League reformed and lasted for three years, from  through . At Class D, it was considered on the lowest rung of the minor league ladder, and had six clubs located in the American states of Alabama, Georgia, North Carolina and Tennessee. Stung by the midseason collapse of two of its six franchises, this league disbanded on August 2, 1912.

Class B league (1926–50)
In  a new, Class B Southeastern League took the field, with six teams — representing Montgomery, Alabama; Jacksonville and St. Augustine, Florida; and Albany, Columbus and Savannah, Georgia. Although this league would be periodically shut down by the Great Depression and World War II, it continued as a Class B circuit, four levels below Major League Baseball, through .

Its lineup of teams in its final season included the champion Pensacola Fliers, Meridian Millers, Montgomery Rebels, Jackson Senators, Vicksburg Billies, Selma Cloverleafs, Gadsden Pilots and Anniston Rams. Both Gadsden and Anniston withdrew from the league before the end of the season.

Independent league (2002–03)
The most recent version of the Southeastern League was an independent circuit, with member teams were not affiliated with any Major League Baseball team.

The league began play in 2002 after the demise of the All-American Association.  For its inaugural season, it placed teams in Montgomery, Ozark, and Selma, Alabama, along with Pensacola, Florida, Americus, Georgia, and Baton Rouge, Louisiana.  The Ozark Patriots and Americus Arrows franchises folded at mid-season.  The Pensacola Pelicans won the inaugural league championship.

After completing the season, the league added two franchises for 2003.  The league had high hopes for its new team in Macon, Georgia and Houma, Louisiana, along with the already successful clubs in Montgomery and Pensacola.  However, after just two games the Selma Cloverleafs folded, forcing the league to operate the club as a road team for the duration of the season under the name "Southeastern Cloverleafs."  The Macon Peaches also fared a lot worse than expected.  Still, the league completed the year, with Pensacola compiling the league's best mark at 42-23 and Baton Rouge defeating Pensacola, 3 games to 1, in the league championship series.

Ultimately, the league could not survive the arrival of affiliated baseball to Montgomery.  The Orlando Rays of the Southern League, who had played at Walt Disney World for four years, became the Montgomery Biscuits and effectively drove the Wings out of town.  In addition, the Springfield/Ozark Mountain Ducks of the Central Baseball League moved to Pensacola and assumed the Pelicans name.  As a result, the league folded prior to the 2004 season.

Cities represented

Member teams (2003)
Baton Rouge, LA: Baton Rouge Riverbats
Houma, LA: Houma Hawks
Macon, GA: Macon Peaches
Montgomery, AL: Montgomery Wings
Pensacola, FL:Pensacola Pelicans
Selma, AL: Selma/Southeastern Cloverleafs

1910-1912 (class D)
Anniston, AL: Anniston Models 1911-1912 
Asheville, NC: Asheville Moonshiners 1910, moved to Appalachian League 1911-1912 
Bessemer, AL: Bessemer Pipemakers 1912 
Decatur, AL: Decatur Twins 1911 
Gadsden, AL: Gadsden Steel Makers 1910-1912, moved to Georgia-Alabama League 1913-1914 
Huntsville, AL: Huntsville Westerns 1911; Huntsville Mountaineers 1912 
Johnson City, TN: Johnson City Soldiers 1910, moved to Appalachian League 1911-1913 
Knoxville, TN: Knoxville Appalachians 1910, moved to Appalachian League 1911-1914 
Morristown, TN: Morristown Jobbers 1910, moved to Appalachian League 1911-1912 
Rome, GA: Rome Romans 1910; Rome Hillies 1911; Rome Romans 1912 
Selma, AL: Selma Centralites 1911-1912, moved to Cotton States League 1913 
Talladega, AL: Talladega Highlanders 1912

1926-1930, 1932 (class B) 
Albany, GA: Albany Nuts 1926-1928 
Columbus, GA: Columbus Foxes 1926-1930, 1932 
Jackson, MS: Jackson Senators 1932, moved to Dixie League 1933 
Jacksonville, FL: Jacksonville Tars 1926-1930 
Macon, GA: Macon Peaches 1932 
Mobile, AL: Mobile Red Warriors 1932 
Montgomery, AL: Montgomery Lions 1926-1930; Montgomery Capitals 1932 
Pensacola, FL: Pensacola Pilots 1927; Pensacola Flyers 1928-1930 
St. Augustine, FL: St. Augustine Saints 1926-1927 
Savannah, GA: Savannah Indians 1926-1928 
Selma, AL: Selma Selmians 1927; Selma Cloverleafs 1928-1930, 1932 
Tampa, FL: Tampa Krewes 1928; Tampa Smokers 1929-1930 
Waycross, GA: Waycross Saints 1927

1937-1942, 1946-1950 (class B) 
Anniston, AL: Anniston Rams 1938-1942, 1946-1950 
Gadsden, AL: Gadsden Pilots 1938-1941, 1946-1948; Gadsden Chiefs 1949; Gadsden Pilots 1950
Jackson, MS: Jackson Senators 1937-1942, 1946-1950, moved from Cotton States League 1936 
Meridian, MS: Meridian Scrappers 1937-1939; Meridian Bears 1940; Meridian Eagles 1941-1942; Meridian Peps 1946-1948; Meridian Millers 1949-1950 
Mobile, AL: Mobile Shippers 1937-1942 
Montgomery, AL: Montgomery Bombers 1937-1938; Montgomery Rebels 1939-1942, 1946-1950, moved to South Atlantic League 1951 
Pensacola, FL: Pensacola Pilots 1937-1942; Pensacola Fliers 1946-1950 *Selma, AL: Selma Cloverleafs 1937-1941, 1946-1950 
Vicksburg, MS: Vicksburg Billies 1946-1949; Vicksburg Hill Billies 1950

References
 Johnson, Lloyd, and Wolff, Miles, eds., The Encyclopedia of Minor League Baseball, 3d edition. Durham, N.C: Baseball America, 2007.

 
Defunct independent baseball leagues in the United States
Baseball leagues in Alabama 
Baseball leagues in Florida 
Baseball leagues in Georgia (U.S. state) 
Baseball leagues in Louisiana 
Baseball leagues in Mississippi 
Baseball leagues in North Carolina 
Baseball leagues in Tennessee 
Sports leagues established in 1910
Sports leagues established in 1926
Sports leagues established in 2002
Defunct minor baseball leagues in the United States